John Bosustow (December 28, 1817 – July 25, 1880) was an American politician.

Born in Paul, Cornwall, UK, Bosustow settled in Yorkville, Wisconsin Territory, US. He served on the Racine County, Wisconsin Board of Supervisors and was chairman. In 1880, Bosustow served in the Wisconsin State Assembly. He died in Yorkville, Wisconsin in 1880 while still in office.

Notes

1817 births
1880 deaths
People from Paul, Cornwall
People from Yorkville, Wisconsin
American people of Cornish descent
British emigrants to the United States
County supervisors in Wisconsin
Members of the Wisconsin State Assembly
19th-century American politicians